The Obarenes Mountains is a mountain range in northern Spain.

The range has an approximate length of 30 km, and an average altitude of 800 and 900 meters. It extends from Hoces del Ebro in Sobrón (Burgos and Álava provinces) to the Conchas de Haro in La Rioja province, where the Ebro River separates it from the Cantabrian Mountains.

References

Mountain ranges of La Rioja (Spain)
Mountain ranges of the Basque Country (autonomous community)